Levon Martirosyan was Armenia’s ambassador to Canada

He was born on February 19, 1976, in Yerevan.

See also 
 Armenia–Canada relations

References 

1976 births
Living people
Ambassadors of Armenia to Canada